Lee is a town in Madison County, Florida, United States. The population was 375 at the 2020 census.

Geography
U.S. Route 90 passes through the north side of the town, leading northwest  to Madison, the county seat, and southeast  to Live Oak.

Demographics

2020 census
Note: the US Census treats Hispanic/Latino as an ethnic category. This table excludes Latinos from the racial categories and assigns them to a separate category. Hispanics/Latinos can be of any race.

As of the 2020 United States census, there were 375 people, 135 households, and 103 families residing in the town.

2000 census
At the 2000 census there were 352 people, 130 households, and 92 families in the town. The racial makeup of the town was 95.45% White, 2.84% African American, 0.28% Native American, 0.28% Asian, and 1.14% from two or more races. Hispanic or Latino of any race were 2.56%.

Of the 130 households 34.6% had children under the age of 18 living with them, 52.3% were married couples living together, 16.2% had a female householder with no husband present, and 28.5% were non-families. 26.2% of households were one person and 12.3% were one person aged 65 or older. The average household size was 2.71 and the average family size was 3.13.

The age distribution was 30.7% under the age of 18, 5.4% from 18 to 24, 28.7% from 25 to 44, 22.2% from 45 to 64, and 13.1% 65 or older. The median age was 37 years. For every 100 females, there were 96.6 males. For every 100 females age 18 and over, there were 101.7 males.

The median household income was $26,250 and the median family income  was $26,875. Males had a median income of $33,750 versus $21,875 for females. The per capita income for the town was $13,242. About 19.8% of families and 26.5% of the population were below the poverty line, including 46.2% of those under age 18 and 12.8% of those age 65 or over.

Education
Lee Elementary School is a part of the District School Board of Madison County. Secondary school students go to the PreK–8 Madison County Central School, which serves Lee students for middle school, and Madison County High School.

The Suwanee River Regional Library System operates the Lee Library.

References

External links

 

Towns in Madison County, Florida
Towns in Florida